Gromford Meadow is a 1.7-hectare biological Site of Special Scientific Interest in Gromford, south of Saxmundham in Suffolk.

This unimproved base-rich meadow is fed by springs. It has diverse flora with meadowsweet dominant, and other plants include yellow rattle, meadow foxtail, ragged robin, marsh thistle and lesser spearwort.

The site is private land with no public access.

References

Sites of Special Scientific Interest in Suffolk